Betty Heathfield (30 March 1927, Chesterfield – 16 February 2006) was a leading figure in the Miners' Wives Support Groups during the UK miners' strike (1984–1985).

Her papers are located at the Women's Library, London School of Economics, Ref# 7BEH.

References

1927 births
2006 deaths
Deaths from Alzheimer's disease
Deaths from dementia in England
People from Chesterfield, Derbyshire
Alumni of Lancaster University
British communists